Higaturu Rural LLG is a local-level government (LLG) of Oro Province, Papua New Guinea.

Wards
01. New Warisota
02. Hohorita
03. Igora Oil Palm Blks
04. Koipa
05. Kiorota
06. Barevoturu
07. Kendata
08. Duve
09. Kongohambou
10. Binduta
11. Handarituru
12. Awala
13. Sui
14. Boru
15. Mumuni
16. Koropata
17. Sirembi
18. Hungiri
19. Sakita
20. Papoga
21. Ongoho
22. Ehu
23. Ahora & Beuru
24. West Ambogo (Sangara)
25. Sangara 1
26. Sangara 2
27. Isivini
28. Horau

References

Local-level governments of Oro Province